Karel Bendl, or , pseudonym: Podskalský (16 April 1838, Prague, Bohemia, Austrian Empire  20 September 1897, Prague) was a Czech composer.

Life
Bendl was born and died in Prague. He studied at the organ school, where he met and befriended Antonín Dvořák one year before graduating with honors in 1858. By then he had already composed a number of small choral works. In 1861 his Poletuje holubice won a prize and at once became a favorite with the local choral societies. 
In 1864, Bendl went to Brussels, where for a short time he held the post of second conductor of the opera. After visiting Amsterdam and Paris. In Paris, he became influenced by the stage works of Charles Gounod and Ambroise Thomas and especially by Giacomo Meyerbeer.

Bendl's first opera Lejla was successfully produced in 1868. It was followed by Břetislav a Jitka (1870), Starý ženich, a comic opera (1883), Karel Škréta (1883), Dítě Tábora, a prize opera (1892), and Máti Míla (1891). Other operas by Bendl are Indická princezna, Černohorci, a prize opera, and the two operas Čarovný květ and Gina.
His ballad Švanda dudák acquired much popularity; he published a mass in D minor for male voices and another mass for a mixed choir; two songs to "Ave Maria"; a violin sonata and a string quartet Op.119 in F Major; and a quantity of songs and choruses, many of which have come to be regarded as national possessions of Bohemia.

Notes

References

External links 
 Karel Bendl String Quartet in F, Op.119
 Twelve Gipsy songs. 1st and 2nd series. With pianoforte accompaniment (From the Sibley Music Library Digital Score Collection)
 Quartet, strings, op. 119, F major (From the Sibley Music Library Digital Score Collection)
 
 Detailed biography 

Some of the information on this page appears on the website of Edition Silvertrust but permission has been granted to copy, distribute and/or modify this document under the terms of the GNU Free Documentation License.

1838 births
1897 deaths
19th-century classical composers
19th-century conductors (music)
19th-century Czech people
Czech male classical composers
Czech conductors (music)
Male conductors (music)
Czech opera composers
Male opera composers
Musicians from Prague
Czech Romantic composers